Conny Falk (born 30 November 1966) is a former professional tennis player from Sweden.

Biography
Born in Stockholm, Falk began competing on the professional tour in 1985. He appeared in the main draw of the Madrid Tennis Grand Prix in 1988, but competed mostly on the Challenger circuit. Ranked as high as 155 in singles, he won a Challenger tournament at Travemünde in 1988. He also won three Challenger titles in doubles.

While on a visit to the University of Miami in 1988 to see his friend Johan Donar, Falk enquired in the tennis office about the possibility of a scholarship. One was available as Francisco Montana had dropped out at the last minute and Falk joined the university, where he became a three-time All-American and NCAA semi-finalist. In 1991 he became the first University of Miami player to attain the number one ranking.

Challenger titles

Singles: (1)

Doubles: (3)

References

External links
 
 

1966 births
Living people
Swedish male tennis players
Tennis players from Stockholm
Miami Hurricanes men's tennis players